Anthurium grex-avium is a species of plant in the family Araceae. It is endemic to Ecuador. Its natural habitat is subtropical or tropical moist montane forests. It is threatened by habitat loss.

References

Endemic flora of Ecuador
grex-avium
Near threatened plants
Taxonomy articles created by Polbot
Plants described in 1978